Dennis McLaughlin is an American engineer, currently the H.M. King Bhumibol Professor at the Massachusetts Institute of Technology.

Education
B.S.E.E. 1966, Purdue University
M.S.E. 1967, Princeton University
Ph.D. 1985, Princeton University

References

Year of birth missing (living people)
Living people
MIT School of Engineering faculty
Purdue University College of Engineering alumni
Princeton University School of Engineering and Applied Science alumni
21st-century American engineers